Olbrachcice may refer to:
Polish name for Albrechtice (Karviná District) in the Czech Republic
Olbrachcice, Świętokrzyskie Voivodeship (south-central Poland)
Olbrachcice, Masovian Voivodeship (east-central Poland)
Olbrachcice, Silesian Voivodeship (south Poland)
Olbrachcice, Lubusz Voivodeship (west Poland)
Olbrachcice, Opole Voivodeship (south-west Poland)